Kimihiro (written:  or ) is a masculine Japanese given name. Notable people with the name include:

, Japanese speed skater
, Japanese bobsledder

Fictional characters
, a character in the manga series xxxHolic

See also
27739 Kimihiro, a main-belt asteroid

Japanese masculine given names